Hani Watson (born 20 September 1982) is an Australian para powerlifter. She won a bronze medal in the heavyweight event at the 2022 Commonwealth Games.

References 

Living people
1982 births
Year of birth missing (living people)
Place of birth missing (living people)
Female powerlifters
Paralympic powerlifters of Australia
Powerlifters at the 2022 Commonwealth Games
21st-century Australian women
Commonwealth Games bronze medallists for Australia
Commonwealth Games medallists in powerlifting
Medallists at the 2022 Commonwealth Games